Carmen Jordá Buades (born 28 May 1988) is a Spanish motor racing driver. From 2015 to 2017, she was a development driver for the Lotus and Renault Sport Formula One teams. Her appointment by Lotus saw her become just the eleventh woman in history to be part of a Formula 1 team's driver line-up.

She has competed in other motor racing series such as GP3, Indy Lights and the Le Mans Series.

She was born in Alcoy, Spain and currently resides in Valencia, Spain.

Early life and career 
Carmen is the daughter of former motor racing driver Jose Miguel Jordá, who introduced her to the sport at an early age. She began her career in karting, before progressing to Master Junior Formula as a teenager, and then onto Spanish Formula 3.

In the 2007 Spanish Formula 3 season, Jordá finished fourth in the Copa F300 standings – recording three podium finishes during the season. She continued to race in F3 in 2008 and 2009 – competing in the very first season of the new European F3 Open Championship.

In 2009 she competed in the Le Mans Series for the Q8 Oils Hache Team, racing in the LMP2 class.

Indy Lights (2010)
On 19 January 2010, Jordá tested an Indy Lights car for Walker Racing at Sebring International Raceway and later tested an Indy Lights car for Andersen Racing at Barber Motorsports Park. Almost two months later, on March 8, 2010, it was announced that Jordá had signed with Andersen Racing full-time to drive in the Firestone Indy Lights Series for the 2010 season.

Jordá made her first career start in the Firestone Indy Lights Series on March 28, 2010, at the Firestone Indy Grand Prix of St. Petersburg on the Streets of St. Petersburg, finishing in 11th position as the last car running after starting in 15th of 16 cars. After completing only one lap before retiring at Barber Motorsports Park, Jordá had her best career finish in the Firestone Indy Lights Series and attained her first top–10 finish on April 18, 2010, at the Streets of Long Beach. After a three-race hiatus, missing races at the Indianapolis Motor Speedway, Iowa Speedway, and Watkins Glen International, Jordá made her return to competition at the Exhibition Place in Toronto on July 18, 2010. However, the race did not fare well for her, as she finished in last place. The next weekend, at Edmonton City Centre Airport for the Edmonton Indy 100, Jordá completed only six laps in the race before encountering gearbox problems. She finished in last place for the second straight race. Jordá did not make another start for the remainder of the season and missed races at Mid-Ohio Sports Car Course, Infineon Raceway, Chicagoland Speedway, Kentucky Speedway, and Homestead–Miami Speedway.

GP3 (2012–2014)

Jordá made her debut in GP3 with Ocean Racing Technology in 2012. Jordá finished the season 28th in the driver's championship failing to score any points. In 2013 Jordá signed with Bamboo Engineering and finished the season 30th in the driver's championship, again failing to score any points. For 2014 season Jordá signed with Koiranen GP, again failing to score any points.

Formula 1 (2015–2016)
On 6 February 2015, it was announced that Jordá had joined Lotus F1 as a development driver. This made her just one of 11 women in history to be included on a Formula 1 team's driver line-up. However she was only used as a sim driver.

The recruitment of Jorda was vocally criticized by some within the sport. Former rally driver and head of the FIA's Women & Motor Sport Commission, Michèle Mouton, described her as a "marketing gimmick", citing "Simona de Silvestro, Danica Patrick, Susie Wolff or even Beitske Visser" as better choices. Writing for Vice, James Newbold commented that the signing of Jorda had been "the wrong message", suggesting she got the position based on her looks rather than her performances in GP3, where she finished 29th in 2014, while only the series winner Alex Lynn also secured a spot with a Formula One team for 2015. In an interview with Motorsport.com, Jordá spoke of her surprise at Mouton's comments and her ambition to invite her to an F1 race so "she can better understand exactly what her plans are with Lotus". In April 2015, Jordá spoke out in favour of a separate championship for women, saying: "It's not fair that women have to compete in the same championship as men, because we're never going to become World Champion, and I think women deserve that chance." Her view was criticised by other female racing drivers, such as ADAC Formula 4 participant Sophia Flörsch and Indianapolis 500 driver Pippa Mann.

Formula 1 chief executive Bernie Ecclestone defended the appointment of Jordá, praising her in particular for being "prepared to give up what it takes". In an interview with Motorsport.com he spoke of his hopes to unearth more female talent in the future, arguing that a lack of other women racing at a comparable level makes criticism of Jordá unfair. He said: "She is very good. We asked Lotus to see and she has done a good job for them. She wants to be in F1. We have to try to find the right way, but she is not alone. There are plenty of other people." For , Jorda remained with the team, now known as Renault Sport Formula One Team, after Lotus was bought out by the French manufacturer.

In early 2016, former Lotus test driver Marco Sørensen claimed that she had been as much as twelve seconds off his pace in simulator runs. This claim was rejected by Jordá, who told Spanish newspaper AS that her simulator times had been "more or less within a second" of fellow Lotus driver Romain Grosjean.

W Series (2019)
In 2019, Jordá entered qualifying for the W Series. However, she did not attend the evaluation day and was automatically excluded from the qualifying process.

Off-track activities
In December 2017, Jordá was appointed to the FIA's Women in Motorsport commission. Her appointment was greeted with derision by many successful female racing drivers. Speaking to Autosport magazine, then-current Indianapolis 500 driver and race-winning Indy Lights driver Pippa Mann commented that "it is extremely disappointing to learn that a racer with no notable results in any of the categories in which she has competed, and who believes and is quoted as saying that she does not believe we as female racers can compete, has been appointed to the FIA Women in Motorsport Commission."

Racing record

Career summary

Le Mans Series results

American open-wheel racing results
(key) (Races in bold indicate pole position)

Indy Lights

Complete GP3 Series results
(key) (Races in bold indicate pole position) (Races in italics indicate fastest lap)

References

External links

 
 

1988 births
Living people
People from Alcoy
Sportspeople from the Province of Alicante
Sportspeople from Valencia
Spanish racing drivers
Spanish female racing drivers
Euroformula Open Championship drivers
Indy Lights drivers
European Le Mans Series drivers
MRF Challenge Formula 2000 Championship drivers
Spanish GP3 Series drivers
Campos Racing drivers
Koiranen GP drivers
Ocean Racing Technology drivers
Craft-Bamboo Racing drivers